The Sixth Child is a 2022 French drama film directed by Léopold Legrand in his feature debut, and co-written by Legrand and Catherine Paillé. The film is loosely based on the 2018 novel Pleurer des rivières by Alain Jaspard. It stars Sara Giraudeau, Benjamin Lavernhe, Damien Bonnard and Judith Chemla. It had its world premiere at the Angoulême Film Festival on 24 August 2022. It was released in France on 28 September 2022.

Synopsis
Franck and Meriem, a Roma couple, have five children and live in a caravan in Aubervilliers. Franck works as scrap dealer and struggles to earn enough income to support their family. Anna and Julien, both lawyers, are a couple who are unable to have children. One night, Franck unwittingly helps resell stolen scrap metal and, following a road accident, he loses his work van and finds himself accused of theft and risking a prison sentence. Julien successfully defends Franck in court, obtaining a suspended sentence. Julien also has his license revoked. Anna therefore comes to pick him up at the court and ends up driving Franck home. They discover his large family and their precarious living situation.

Shortly thereafter, Franck visits Julien at his office. He explains to him that Meriem is two months pregnant and that their religious convictions forbid abortion, but that they cannot afford to welcome a sixth child. Franck has debts and needs to buy a van. He and his wife believe that Julien and Anna would make good parents, and that in exchange, the couple could help them to get out of their difficult financial circumstance.

Cast

Production
The Sixth Child was produced by Frédéric Brillion and Gilles Legrand on behalf of Epithète Films in co-production with France 2 Cinéma. Filming took place from 12 April 2021 to 28 May 2021 in Paris.

Release
The film had its world premiere at the 15th Angoulême Film Festival on 24 August 2022. The film was theatrically released in France on 28 September 2022 by Pyramide Distribution.

Awards and nominations

References

External links
 

2022 films
2022 directorial debut films
2020s French films
2020s French-language films
2022 drama films
Films based on French novels
French films based on novels
French drama films
France 2 Cinéma films
Films about adoption
Films about Romani people
Films about poverty in France
Films set in Paris
Films shot in Paris
Human trafficking in France